Speight-Bynum House is a historic plantation house located near Walstonsburg, Greene County, North Carolina.  It was built about 1850, and is a two-story, double pile, three bay, Greek Revival style heavy timber frame dwelling.  It has a one-story rear addition built in 1938, a low hip roof, and one-story full width front porch.  Also on the property is a contributing smokehouse (c. 1850).

It was listed on the National Register of Historic Places in 1992.

References

Plantation houses in North Carolina
Houses on the National Register of Historic Places in North Carolina
Greek Revival houses in North Carolina
Houses completed in 1850
Houses in Greene County, North Carolina
National Register of Historic Places in Greene County, North Carolina